The Moonga Stakes is a Melbourne Racing Club Group 3 Thoroughbred horse race, for four year olds and upwards, at Set Weights with penalties, over a distance of 1400 metres, held annually at Caulfield Racecourse, Melbourne, Australia in October.  Total prize money for the race is A$200,000.

History

Name
 1987–1992 - Richard Ellis Plate
 1993–1994 - The Myer Stakes
 1995 - Richard Ellis Plate
 1996 - Vo Rogue Stakes (In honour of champion - Vo Rogue)
 1997 - Tablerite Stakes
 1998–1999 - IGA Supermarkets Stakes
 2000 - Ansett Australia Stakes
 2001–2002 - Melbourne Racing Club Stakes
 2003 - Farewell To Northerly Stakes (In honour of champion - Northerly)
 2004 - Melbourne Racing Club Stakes
 2005–2006 - Harrolds 101 Stakes
 2007–2008 - Jayco Cup
 2009–2011 - Betfair Stakes
 2012 onwards - Moonga Stakes

Grade
 1988–1993 - Principal race
 1994 onwards - Group 3

Winners

 2022 - Aegon
 2021 - Buffalo River
 2020 - Wild Planet
 2019 - Streets Of Avalon
 2018 - Sircconi
 2017 - Ulmann
 2016 - Voodoo Lad
 2015 - Vashka
 2014 - Lucky Hussler
 2013 - Boban
 2012 - Whateverwhenever
 2011 - Love Conquers All
 2010 - Rothera
 2009 - McClintock
 2008 - Royal Discretion
 2007 - Lord Of The Dance
 2006 - Perfectly Ready
 2005 - Volitant
 2004 - Amtrak
 2003 - Thorn Park
 2002 - Assertive Lad
 2001 - Flavour
 2000 - Cellar
 1999 - Another Neptune
 1998 - Buster Jones
 1997 - Monets Cove
 1996 - Mamzelle Pedrille
 1995 - Royal Blue
 1994 - Star Dancer 
 1993 - Cogitate
 1992 - Rough Habit
 1991 - Steineck
 1990 - Royal Pay
 1989 - Heavenly View
 1988 - Vo Rogue

See also
 List of Australian Group races
 Group races

References

Horse races in Australia